Mount Cary is a mountain in Dukes County, Massachusetts. Mount Surat is located northeast of Mount Cary.

References

Mountains of Massachusetts
Mountains of Dukes County, Massachusetts